Karl, Prince of Hohenzollern-Sigmaringen (20 February 1785 – 11 March 1853) was the reigning Prince of Hohenzollern-Sigmaringen from 1831 to 1848.

In 1833, Karl summoned a constitutional assembly (Landtag) and promulgated a constitutional charter as the law in his lands.  He founded a hospital for his subjects, and had the Ständehaus built on the modern Leopoldsplatz in Sigmaringen (today owned by the Hohenzollerische Landesbank).  Karl also removed the burden of serfdom and various other medieval laws.

During the German revolutions of 1848–1849 Karl abdicated in favor of his son, Karl Anton, on 27 August 1848.

His marriage as hereditary prince at the imperial court in Paris on 4 February 1808 to Princess Antoinette Murat, a niece of Napoleon I's brother-in-law, the French Marshal Joachim Murat who was then Grand Duke of Berg, constituted a union between extended family members of the previously warring French imperial and Prussian royal dynasties following Napoleonic victories on the European continent. Following the death of his first wife on 19 January 1847, Karl married Princess Katharina (1817–1893), daughter of Karl III Albrecht, last reigning Prince of Hohenlohe-Waldenburg-Schillingsfürst, and the widow since 1845 of Count Franz Erwin von Ingelheim, on 14 March 1848.

He died on 11 March 1853 in Bologna, while traveling to Rome.

Children
From his first marriage he had the following children:
 Karoline von Hohenzollern-Sigmaringen (1810–1885)
∞ 1. 1839 Count Friedrich Franz Anton von Hohenzollern-Hechingen (1790–1847)
∞ 2. 1850 Johann Stäger von Waldburg (1822–1882)
 Karl Anton (1811–1885), Prince of Hohenzollern, Prussian minister
∞ 1834 Princess Josephine of Baden (1813–1900)
 Amalie of Hohenzollern-Sigmaringen (1815–1841)
∞ 1835 Prince Eduard von Sachsen-Altenburg (1804–1852)
 Friederike von Hohenzollern-Sigmaringen (1820–1906)
∞ 1844 Marchese Gioacchino Napoleone Pepoli (1825–1881)

Ancestry

References

1785 births
1853 deaths
Princes of Hohenzollern-Sigmaringen
People from Sigmaringen